"Jōnetsu no Daishō/Escape" is the third single by the band Girl Next Door and it was released on November 19, 2008. This was the last single the band released before their first album Girl Next Door. Jōnetsu no Daishō was the theme song for the Japanese television drama Giragira while "Escape" was used as the commercial song for Au's W65T phone.

CD track listing 
 
 Escape
 Jōnetsu no Daishō (Shinichi Osawa Remix)
 Jōnetsu no Daishō (Ice Cream Mix)

DVD track listing 
 Jōnetsu no Daishō (Music Video: Special Version)

Charts

External links
 Official website 

2008 singles
Girl Next Door (band) songs
Japanese television drama theme songs
Avex Trax singles
2008 songs